Wattoo Wattoo Super Bird is a French cartoon series created in 1978. Consisting of 60 five-minute episodes, the series was intended to teach morals to children.

The eponymous Wattoo Wattoo is a black and white ovoid bird. He comes from a cube-shaped planet called Auguste.  In the first episode he becomes aware of the very stupid and extremely wasteful race called Zwas.  The Zwas are goose-like creatures (in French, "les Zwas" sounds like "les oies" = the geese) that live on the Earth in cities very much like our own. They have exaggerated human characteristics, they are irascible, badly behaved and generally thoughtless. The Zwas are not without kindness however and many of them keep pets called Credo who are spheroid cats, dogs and other similar creatures. Often the actions of the Zwas puts the Credos in danger.

Throughout the series Wattoo Wattoo helps the Zwas overcome their problems through the use of his seemingly magical powers. He is able to transform himself into any shape. Should he need the help of others of his race he has only to whistle.  Other identical birds respond to the call and come down from space like comets. As they fly down they vibrate and duplicate themselves until they are a flock ready to take on whatever challenge is required of them.

The series was written and directed by René Borg, co-written by Hubert Ballay and narrated by Dorothée in the original French language version.

External links
 
  The first episode of the series

1978 French television series debuts
1970s French animated television series
Animated television series about birds
Animated television series about extraterrestrial life
French children's animated television series
Television series about shapeshifting